Goto, Island of Love is a 1968 French drama film directed by Walerian Borowczyk and starring Pierre Brasseur.

Cast
 Pierre Brasseur - Goto
 Ligia Branice - Glossia
  - Gono
 Ginette Leclerc - Gonasta
  - L'instituteur / Professor
  - Grymp
 Pierre Collet
  - General Gwino
  - Le juge d'instruction

References

External links

1968 films
1968 drama films
Dystopian films
Films about capital punishment
Films about suicide
French drama films
1960s French-language films
French black-and-white films
Films directed by Walerian Borowczyk
1960s French films